Ulla Sipilä is a Finnish ice hockey referee. She has officiated in the Women's World Cup (2008 and 2009) as well as the 2010 Winter Olympics.

References

External links
Junnut.com 

Year of birth missing (living people)
Living people
Finnish ice hockey officials